Newry was a United Kingdom Parliament constituency in Ireland returning one MP. It was an original constituency represented in Parliament when the Union of Great Britain and Ireland took effect on 1 January 1801.

Boundaries
This constituency was the parliamentary borough of Newry in County Down.

Members of Parliament

Elections

Elections in the 1830s

Elections in the 1840s

Elections in the 1850s
Needham's death caused a by-election.

Elections in the 1860s

Elections in the 1870s
Kirk's death caused a by-election.

Elections in the 1880s

Elections in the 1890s

Elections in the 1900s

Elections in the 1910s

References

The Parliaments of England by Henry Stooks Smith (1st edition published in three volumes 1844–50), 2nd edition edited (in one volume) by F.W.S. Craig (Political Reference Publications 1973)

Westminster constituencies in County Down (historic)
Westminster constituencies in County Armagh (historic)
Constituencies of the Parliament of the United Kingdom established in 1801
Constituencies of the Parliament of the United Kingdom disestablished in 1918
Politics of Newry